Andes Historic District is a national historic district located at Andes in Delaware County, New York. The district contains 129 contributing buildings.  The buildings are largely two story detached frame structures dating to the mid-19th century.  The majority are residential structures.

It was listed on the National Register of Historic Places in 1984.

References

National Register of Historic Places in Delaware County, New York
Historic districts on the National Register of Historic Places in New York (state)
Historic districts in Delaware County, New York